Michael J. Loux (born August 17, 1942) is an American philosopher and George N. Shuster Professor of Philosophy Emeritus at the University of Notre Dame. 
He is known for his works on metaphysics.

Books
 Metaphysics: A Contemporary Introduction, 4th. ed. (co-author) (2017)
 Metaphysics: A Contemporary Introduction, 3rd. ed. (2006)
 Nature, Norm, and Psyche: Explorations in Aristotelian Psychology (2004)
     Oxford Handbook of Metaphysics, co-editor (2003)
     Metaphysics: Contemporary Readings (2001)
     Primary Ousia (1991)
     The Possible and the Actual (1980)
     The Synoptic Vision, (co-author) (1977)
     Substance and Attribute (1978)
     Ockham's Theory of Terms: Part I of the Summa Logica (1974)
     Universals and Particulars (1970)

References

21st-century American philosophers
Philosophy academics
Living people
1942 births
University of Notre Dame faculty
University of Chicago alumni
Metaphysicians